RAB may refer to:

Aomori Broadcasting Corporation or Radio Aomori Broadcasting, in Japan
Rabaul Airport, Papua New Guinea, IATA code
Radio Access Bearers in mobile telephony
Ramstein Air Base
Rapid Action Battalion, Bangladesh
Redfern All Blacks, an Australian rugby league team

See also
 Rab (disambiguation)